Total Control is the first mini-album by Australian indie pop singer-songwriter Missy Higgins, released on 4 March 2022.

As per the press release, Total Control has "themes of exploitation and female empowerment" and its songs were inspired by musical fragments for certain scenes of ABC TV's political drama, Total Control.

The album was co-produced by Higgins's friend Brendon Love, one of the Teskey Brothers. Higgins called the mini-album "about taking control as a woman", "taking back what's yours", the "right to write your own story" and about "finding strength through your love for your family, and your connections to your history".

At the 2022 ARIA Music Awards, the release was nominated for Best Adult Contemporary Album.

Track listing

Charts

References

2022 EPs
EPs by Australian artists
Missy Higgins albums